Hakim Karim (1905–1942) was a Tajik Soviet writer. He was born in Khujand and was educated in a Russian school. He lived in Aktyubinsk for a while, before moving to the capital Dushanbe in 1925 to head the agitprop department of the Tajik Komsomol. In 1926, he became a member of the Communist Party. He lived for a while in Moscow, and worked as an editor of the Tajik-language party organ Proletari Khujandi.

Returning to Dushanbe, he lived in a Writers' Union housing block, where the writer Jalol Ikrami was his neighbour. Karim and his wife Bonukhon were arrested and imprisoned as part of Stalin's purges, but they were later released in 1938. While they were in prison, their eldest son died in an orphanage, prompting the return of the bereaved parents to Khujand (then known as Leninobod). When the Second World War began, Karim joined the army. He is thought to have died in the battle for Staraya Russa.

Also known as Karim-zoda, Hakim Karim was principally a prose writer, best known for his novels, short stories and plays. His most significant work is a play called 1916, portraying the Tajik uprising against the late Tsarist empire.

References

1905 births
1942 deaths
People from Khujand
People from Samarkand Oblast
Tajikistani writers
Tajikistani dramatists and playwrights
Soviet dramatists and playwrights
Soviet male writers
Soviet military personnel killed in World War II